Solo Oil was an Australian petroleum distributor that operated from 1974 until 1989 when taken over by Ampol.

History
Solo Oil was founded in 1974 by David Goldberger and David Wieland. Goldberg negotiated an agreement with Mobil Australia, for the supply of petroleum at a fixed rate, following the increase in world fuel prices, this discount increased from six cents to 12.5 cents per gallon. In July 1975, it joined forces with the Australian Council of Trade Unions to sell discounted fuel to independent operators in Melbourne. In April 1977 it commenced operations in Sydney.
 
In 1989 the business was sold to Ampol by which time it was the largest independent fuel retailer and distributor with over 200 service stations. Goldberger and Wieland were subject to a ten year non-compete clause however this was ruled void by the Trade Practices Commission after Ampol merged with Caltex, allowing them to establish Liberty Oil in 1995.

References

Automotive fuel retailers in Australia
Companies based in Melbourne
Energy companies established in 1974
Retail companies established in 1974
Retail companies disestablished in 1989
1974 establishments in Australia
1989 disestablishments in Australia